Who's Who in Society is a 1915 American silent comedy film directed by George Fitzmaurice and starring Dan Moyles, Kate Sergeantson, and Della Connor.

Cast 
 Dan Moyles as Patrick O'Brien 
 Kate Sergeantson as Mrs. O'Brien 
 Della Connor as Mary Ellen O'Brien 
 William H. Power as The detective 
 Edward Lester as Lord Algy

References

Bibliography
 Jay Robert Nash, Robert Connelly & Stanley Ralph Ross. Motion Picture Guide Silent Film 1910-1936. Cinebooks, 1988.

External links
 

1915 films
1915 comedy films
1910s English-language films
American silent feature films
Silent American comedy films
American black-and-white films
Films directed by George Fitzmaurice
1910s American films